In the 2015–16 Aris Thessaloniki B.C. season, Aris Thessaloniki finished in the 3rd place of regular season of the Greek Basket League, and then lost to Panathinaikos during the playoff semifinals, with a 3–2 series score. Then the club faced AEK Athens for the playoff's 3rd place, where they lost the series 3–1, and finally finished in fourth place. 

Aris Thessaloniki was eliminated by Panathinaikos with in Semifinals of the Greek Basketball Cup. 

In the EuroCup, Aris was eliminated in the Last 32. The club was unbeaten in every home game at Nick Galis Hall.

First-team squad

Competitions

Overall

Overview

Greek Basket League

Regular season

Standings

Matches

Results overview

Playoffs

Quarterfinals

Semifinals

Third Place

Greek Cup

EuroCup

Regular season

Group table

Last 32

Group table

References

Aris B.C. seasons